Eugen Munder (9 October 1899 – 20 November 1952) was an early member of the Nazi Party and Gauleiter of Gau Württemberg-Hohenzollern.

Life
Munder was born in Stuttgart, Württemberg, Germany in 1899. After attending elementary school, he attended military school in Jena and then became an apprentice in the civil service. He was conscripted in 1917, assigned to Field Artillery Regiment 13 in Ulm and participated in World War I. He saw action on the front lines in Field Artillery Regiment No. 116 and in Sturmbataillon 16.  Following Germany's defeat, Munder was demobilized in January 1919 and became an activist in the Deutschvölkischer Schutz und Trutzbund, the largest, most active, and most influential anti-Semitic federation in Germany after the war. He resumed his career in the civil service, working as an actuary and passing written and oral examinations in 1921.

By 1921 Munder was already active on behalf of the Nazi Party in Stuttgart. On 15 April 1925 he joined the Party (Membership No. 1835) when the ban on it was lifted. He was a very effective organizer and re-founded the party's Gau headquarters, becoming the local branch leader (Ortsgruppenleiter) in Stuttgart. Adolf Hitler appointed him Gauleiter of Württemberg after a rally in Stuttgart on 8 July 1925. From 1925 to 1928 Munder served as the editor and publisher of a local Nazi newspaper, The Southwest German Observer. In 1927 Munder expressed criticism of Hitler's lifestyle. He also was involved in a major row over the candidate list for upcoming elections to the Württemberg Landtag. When Hitler supported his rival Christian Mergenthaler to head the list over him, Munder resigned as Gauleiter on 9 January 1928. His successor was Wilhelm Murr. Munder then was expelled from the NSDAP on 18 January 1928 and thereafter played no active part in politics.

He resumed his career as a civil servant, working largely in the field of health insurance. After the Nazi seizure of power in 1933, Munder reapplied for party membership but was rejected on two occasions. In 1935 he became the head of the General Health Insurance Office in Stuttgart. Finally, he was readmitted to the Party effective 1 August 1935. He also joined the Sturmabteilung (SA) around this time. In October 1944 he was recruited as a platoon leader in the Württemberg Volkssturm, rising to battalion leader in January 1945.

After the end of World War II he was arrested, and in April 1948 sentenced to four and a half years in a labor camp by a de-Nazification court. After suffering epileptic seizures, Munder was released from custody in July 1948 on medical grounds and placed on parole. He was found to have a slow growing brain tumor and he died on 20 November 1952.

References

Literature 
Karl Höffkes: Hitlers Politische Generale. Die Gauleiter des 3. Reiches; ein biographisches Nachschlagewerk. Grabert-Verlag, Tübingen 1997, .
Michael D. Miller & Andreas Schulz: Gauleiter: The Regional Leaders of the Nazi Party and Their Deputies, 1925-1945, Volume II (Georg Joel - Dr. Bernhard Rust), R. James Bender Publishing, 2017, .
Michael Matthiesen: Munder, Eugen Paul; in: Württembergische Biographien, Band III, Stuttgart 2017, .

1899 births
1952 deaths
German Army personnel of World War I
German newspaper editors
Gauleiters
People from the Kingdom of Württemberg
People from Stuttgart
20th-century German newspaper publishers (people)
Volkssturm personnel
Sturmabteilung personnel